Qurayha (also as , , or)  is a neighborhood in the sub-governorate of Bariq in the province of Asir, Saudi Arabia. Qurayha was most important market (held on Sunday) of the neighbourhood. It is the capital of Musa ibn Ali tribe.

See also 

 List of cities and towns in Saudi Arabia
 Regions of Saudi Arabia

References 

Populated places in 'Asir Province
Populated coastal places in Saudi Arabia
Populated places in Bareq